The Hector Medal, formerly known as the Hector Memorial Medal, is a science award given by the Royal Society Te Apārangi in memory of Sir James Hector to researchers working in New Zealand. It is awarded annually in rotation for different sciences – currently there are three: chemical sciences; physical sciences; mathematical and information sciences. It is given to a researcher who "has undertaken work of great scientific or technological merit and has made an outstanding contribution to the advancement of the particular branch of science." It was previously rotated through more fields of science – in 1918 they were: botany, chemistry, ethnology, geology, physics (including mathematics and astronomy), zoology (including animal physiology). For a few years it was awarded biennially – it was not awarded in 2000, 2002 or 2004.

In 1991 it was overtaken by the Rutherford Medal as the highest award given by the Royal Society of New Zealand.

The obverse of the medal bears the head of James Hector and the reverse a Māori snaring a huia. The last confirmed sighting of a living huia predates the award of the medal by three years.

Recipients

See also
 :Category:New Zealand scientists
 The Shorland Medal given by the New Zealand Association of Scientists
 List of chemistry awards
 List of mathematics awards
 List of physics awards

References

External links 

 Hector Medal, Royal Society of New Zealand Te Apārangi

Science and technology in New Zealand
New Zealand science and technology awards
Science and technology awards
Royal Society of New Zealand
Chemistry awards
Physics awards
Mathematics awards